Sir John Henry Lambert,  (8 January 1921 – 6 July 2015) was a British diplomat. From 1977 to 1981 he was the United Kingdom's ambassador to Tunisia.

Early life
Lambert was born on 8 January 1921 to Ronald Lambert, MC and Hazel Mary Lambert (née Cox). He was educated at Eton College, an all-boys public school near Windsor, Berkshire. He spent one year studying at Trinity College, Cambridge, before being called up for military service in 1940.

Military service
In 1940, Lambert was called up for military service.

Diplomatic career
On 18 September 1977, he was appointed Her Majesty's Ambassador to the Tunisian Republic.

Honours and decorations
He was appointed CMG in the 1975 New Year Honours, and on 23 October 1980 Lambert was appointed Knight Commander of the Royal Victorian Order (KCVO). He was knighted by Queen Elizabeth II aboard HMY Britannia at the end of her state visit to Tunisia in October 1980. In 1980, he was appointed Grand Officer of the Order of the Tunisian Republic.

References

1921 births
2015 deaths
Ambassadors of the United Kingdom to Tunisia
Grenadier Guards officers
Companions of the Order of St Michael and St George
Knights Commander of the Royal Victorian Order
People educated at Eton College
British Army personnel of World War II
Alumni of Trinity College, Cambridge